Zee Talkies is a Marathi pay television channel broadcasting Marathi movies by Zee Entertainment Enterprises. It is the first Marathi movie channel airing old classics and latest Marathi movies 24 hours a day. It was launched on 25 August 2007. A HD version of the channel, Zee Talkies HD, was launched on 15 October 2016.

Reception

Programming 
The channel telecasts a mythological show Gajar Kirtanacha, Sohla Anandacha daily from February 2017. This show completed its 1000 episodes in July 2019. It also telecasts a show Manmandira: Gajar Bhakticha from 25 June 2018 airing Monday to Saturday. The show Na.Sa.Te. Udoyg was also aired every Sunday from 29 October 2017 to 29 April 2018.

Award functions

References

External links 
 Zee Talkies at ZEE5
 Zee Talkies Official Website

Marathi-language television channels
Zee Entertainment Enterprises
Television channels and stations established in 2007
Movie channels in India